LVD may refer to:
 Low-voltage differential signaling, an electrical signaling method that can run at very high speeds over inexpensive twisted-pair copper cables.
 Low Voltage Directive, European directive 2006/95/EC for the safety of electrical equipment sold within the European Union.
 Low-voltage detect is a microcontroller technology that asserts a RESET when Vcc falls below Vref.
 Large Volume Detector, particle physics experiment situated in Italy.
 Liquid vapor display, display technology.
 Ludwig Von Drake, Disney character